Hang On may refer to:

Songs 
 "Hang On" (Plumb song)
 "Hang On" (Weezer song)
 "Hang On", by Guster from Ganging Up on the Sun
 "Hang On", by Hank III, originally recorded for the unreleased album This Ain't Country, but later released on Ramblin' Man
 "Hang On", by James from Gold Mother
 "Hang On", by Seether from Daredevil: The Album
 "Hang On", by Seether from Disclaimer II
 "Hang On", by Smash Mouth from Get The Picture?
 "Hang On", by Teenage Fanclub from Thirteen

Other uses 
 Hang-On, a 1985 Sega arcade game